Haglund is a Swedish surname. Notable people with the surname include:

A. J. Haglund (born 1983), American football player
Carl Haglund, Finnish politician
Carl Haglund (real estate), American landlord and real estate developer
Dean Haglund, Canadian actor
Hallie Haglund, American comedian
Ivar Haglund (1905–1985), American folk singer and founder of Ivar's
Karl Haglund, Swedish track and field athlete
Kerstin Haglund, Swedish orienteering competitor
Kirsten Haglund (born 1988), Miss America winner
Lars Haglund, Swedish discus thrower
Linda Haglund, Swedish Olympic sprinter
Maria Haglund, Swedish sprint canoer
Philip Haglund, Swedish footballer
Sophie Haglund, Swedish actress

See also
 Haglund's deformity, bony enlargement on the back of the heel
 Hägglund

Swedish-language surnames